Terra incognita is a Latin phrase meaning 'unknown land', describing regions that have not been mapped or documented.

Terra incognita may also refer to:

 Terra Incognita (Gojira album)
 Terra Incognita (Juliette Lewis album), 2009
 Terra Incognita (Chris Whitley album),
 Terra Incognita: Ambient Works 1975 to Present, a compilation of Boyd Rice music
 "Terra Incognita" (short story), a 1931 short story by Vladimir Nabokov
 Terra incognita arts organisation + publishers, a not-for-profit visual arts and curatorial organisation
 Terra Incognita, an album (2011) by Coronatus
 Terra incognita (2002 film), a 2002 Lebanese-French drama film 
 Terra Incognita (role-playing game), a 2001 role-playing game published
 Terra Incognita (sculpture), a 1995 sculpture by Ilan Averbuch
 Terra Incognita, fantasy series by Kevin J. Anderson

See also
 Tierra Incognita, an Argentinian television series
 Terra ignota ("unfamiliar land")
 Terra nullius ("no man's land")
 Terra Australis Incognita ("The unknown land of the South")